The Abgar legend is a set of letters that claim to be a correspondence exchanged between Jesus of Nazareth and King Abgar V of Osroene. The documents first surfaced in the fourth century when Eusebius of Caesarea published the two letters which were allegedly discovered in the archives of Edessa. They claim to be written during the last year of Jesus' life.

Abgar V was king of Osroene with his capital city at Edessa, a Syrian city in upper Mesopotamia. According to the legend, King Abgar V was stricken with leprosy and had heard of Jesus’ miracles. Acknowledging Jesus' divine mission, Abgar wrote a letter of correspondence to Jesus Christ asking to be cured of his ailment. He then invited Jesus to seek refuge in Edessa as a safe haven from persecution. In his alleged reply, Jesus applauded the king for his faith but turned down the request. He expressed regret that his mission in life precluded him from visiting the city. Jesus blessed Abgar and promised that after he ascended into heaven, one of his disciples would heal all of the illnesses of the king and his subjects in Edessa.

The letters, while taken seriously in many Christian traditions for centuries, are generally classed as pseudepigrapha by modern Christians and scholars.

Development of the Abgar legend
The story of how King Abgar and Jesus had corresponded was first recounted in the 4th century by the church historian Eusebius of Caesarea in his Ecclesiastical History (i.13 and iii.1) and it was retold in elaborated form by Ephrem the Syrian in the fifth-century Syriac Doctrine of Addai.

An early version of the Abgar legend exists in the Syriac Doctrine of Addai, an early Christian document from Edessa. The Epistula Abgari is a Greek recension of the letter of correspondence exchanged between Jesus Christ and Abgar V of Edessa, known as the Acts of Thaddaeus. The letters were likely composed in the early 4th century. The legend became relatively popular in the Middle Ages that the letters were translated from Syriac into the Greek, Armenian, Latin, Coptic and Arabic languages.

Historical context
Eusebius contains the earliest known account of the Abgar legend in his first book Ecclesiastical History (ca. 325 C.E.), as part of his discussion of Thaddeus of Edessa. Eusebius claims that Thaddeus went to Abgar at the request of Thomas the Apostle, following Jesus’ resurrection. He also claims to provide the correspondence between Abgar and Jesus, which he translates from Syriac.

Letter of Abgar to Jesus 
The church historian Eusebius records that the Edessan archives contained a copy of a correspondence exchanged between Abgar of Edessa and Jesus. The correspondence consisted of Abgar's letter and the answer dictated by Jesus. On August 15, 944, the Church of St. Mary of Blachernae in Constantinople received the letter and the Mandylion. Both relics were then moved to the Church of the Virgin of the Pharos.

A curious growth has arisen from this event, with scholars disputing whether Abgar suffered from gout or from leprosy, whether the correspondence was on parchment or papyrus, and so forth.

The text of the letter was:Jesus gave the messenger the reply to return to Abgar:Egeria wrote of the letter in her account of her pilgrimage in Edessa. She read the letter during her stay, and remarked that the copy in Edessa was fuller than the copies in her home (which was likely France).

In addition to the importance it attained in the apocryphal cycle, the correspondence of King Abgar also gained a place in liturgy for some time. The Syriac liturgies commemorate the correspondence of Abgar during Lent. The Celtic liturgy appears to have attached importance to it; the Liber Hymnorum, a manuscript preserved at Trinity College, Dublin (E. 4, 2), gives two collects on the lines of the letter to Abgar. It is even possible that this letter, followed by various prayers, may have formed a minor liturgical office in some Catholic churches.

This event has played an important part in the self-definition of several Eastern churches. Abgar is counted as saint, with feasts on May 11 and October 28 in the Eastern Orthodox Church, August 1 in the Syrian Church, and daily in the Mass of the Armenian Apostolic Church.

Critical scholarship 
The Dominican friar Giordano Polisicchio (d. 1744) proved the correspondence of Jesus and Abgar of Edessa to be spurious and probably Arian.

A number of contemporary scholars have suggested origins of the tradition of Abgar's conversion apart from historical record. S. K. Ross suggests the story of Abgar is in the genre of a genealogical myth which traces the origin of a community back to a mythical or divine ancestor. F. C. Burkitt argues that the conversion of Edessa at the time of Abgar VIII was retrojected upon the Apostolic age. William Adler suggests the origin of the story of the conversion of Abgar V was an invention of an antiquarian researcher employed by Abgar VIII, who had recently converted to Christianity, in an effort to securely root Christianity in the history of the city. Walter Bauer, on the other hand, argued the legend was written without sources to reinforce group cohesiveness, orthodoxy, and apostolic succession against heretical schismatics. However, several distinct sources, known to have not been in contact with one another, claimed to have seen the letters in the archives, so his claim is suspect.

Significant advances in scholarship on the topic have been made by Desreumaux's translation with commentary, M. Illert's collection of textual witnesses to the legend, and detailed studies of the ideology of the sources by Brock, Griffith, and Mirkovic. The majority of scholars now claim the goal of the authors and editors of texts regarding the conversion of Abgar were not so much concerned with historical reconstruction of the Christianisation of Edessa as the relationships between church and state power, based on the political and ecclesiastical ideas of Ephraem the Syrian. However, the origins of the story are far still from certain, although the stories as recorded seem to have been shaped by the controversies of the third century CE, especially as a response to Bardaisan.

The scholar Bart D. Ehrman cites evidence from Han Drijvers and others for regarding the whole correspondence as forged in the third century by orthodox Christians "as an anti-Manichaean polemic", and entirely spurious.

References

Sources 

  (German original published in 1934)

External links 
 Ante-Nicene Fathers, vol. VIII: Acts of the Holy Apostle Thaddeus, One of the Twelve
 Epistle of Jesus Christ to Abgarus King of Edessa from Eusebius
 Correspondence between Abgarus Ouchama, King of Edessa, and Jesus of Nazareth (J.Lorber, 1842)
 English translation of ancient documents on the conversion of Abgar, including relevant passages from Eusebius and the Doctrine of Addai are available in 

Christian folklore
Relics associated with Jesus
Jesus and history
Christianity in Jerusalem
Christian terminology
Christian relics
Texts in Syriac
Abgar
Oriental Orthodoxy